= Bagh Feiz =

Coordinates: 35.7442°N 51.3225°E

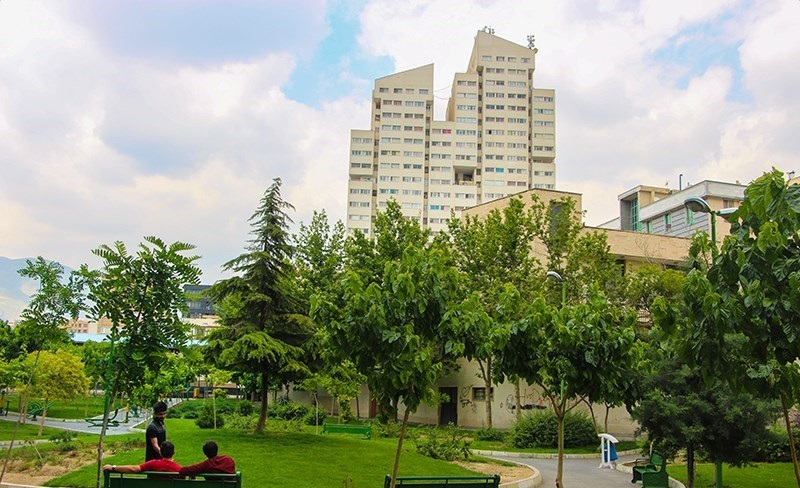
Bagh Feiz in 2017

Bagh e Feiz or Bāgh-e Feiz (Persian: باغ‌فیض) is a posh neighbourhood located West of Tehran, the capital city of Iran.

Kourosh Mall or Kourosh Complex, which is one of the biggest shopping centres and movie theatres in Tehran, is located in this neighbourhood.
